Xylographa is a genus of lichenized fungi in the family Xylographaceae.

Species
Xylographa bjoerkii  (2014)
Xylographa carneopallida  (2014)
Xylographa constricta  (2014)
Xylographa crassithallia  (2004)
Xylographa erratica  (2014)
Xylographa hians  (1888)
Xylographa isidiosa  (2013)
Xylographa lagoi   (2014)
Xylographa opegraphella  (1857)
Xylographa parallela  (1849)
Xylographa perminuta  (1982)
Xylographa pruinodisca  (2004)
Xylographa schofieldii  (2014)
Xylographa septentrionalis  (2014)
Xylographa soralifera  (2008)
Xylographa stenospora  (2014)
Xylographa trunciseda  (1938)
Xylographa vermicularis  (2014)
Xylographa vitiligo  (1963)

References

Baeomycetales
Lichen genera
Taxa named by Elias Magnus Fries
Baeomycetales genera
Taxa described in 1822